Grand Chute is a ghost neighborhood in the city of Appleton in Outagamie County, Wisconsin.

History

Morgan L. Martin, Theodore Conkey, and Abram B. Bowen founded the village of Martin in 1849. In 1850 they renamed it Grand Chute after the town of Grand Chute. Grand Chute was one of three villages that developed around Lawrence Institute (now Lawrence University). The villages of Lawesburg, Appleton, and Grand Chute were all nestled along the Fox River (Wisconsin).

Geography
Grand Chute is located at  (44.254642, -88.415408). Its elevation is 791 feet (241m).

References

Ghost towns in Wisconsin
Geography of Outagamie County, Wisconsin